The  Palacio de Santa Cruz or Palace of the Holy Cross is a baroque building in central Madrid, Spain. It now houses the Spanish Foreign Ministry. It was used as a jail until the reign of Philip IV of Spain, when it was converted into a palace.

Construction was commissioned in 1629 by Philip IV to house both courts and jail facilities. The architect Juan Gómez de Mora  worked on it from 1629 to 1636, and later other architects like  José de Villareal, Bartolomé Hurtado García, and José del Olmo added elements.

In 1767 it changed from jail to the Palacio de Santa Cruz, due to its proximity to the church of Santa Cruz. A fire destroyed all but the facade in 1791.

References

Sources

 History of the Palacio de Santa Cruz by Ministerio de Asuntos Exteriores
 Palacio de Santa Cruz. Entrada de Madrid Histórico

Santa Cruz
Bien de Interés Cultural landmarks in Madrid
Baroque architecture in Madrid
Buildings and structures in Sol neighborhood, Madrid